Ari Paunonen (born 10 March 1958) is a Finnish male former middle- and long-distance runner who competed over distances from 800 metres up to 10,000 metres. His best international performances at a major event were bronze at the 1977 European Cup and fifth at the 1983 European Athletics Indoor Championships. He was also the 1500 m silver medallist at the Nordic Indoor Athletics Championships in 1986.

His personal best time of 3:55.65 minutes for the mile run is a Finnish record. He also set a European under-20 record of 7:43.20 minutes for the 3000 metres in 1977. As a junior athlete he won back-to-back 1500 m titles at the European Athletics Junior Championships in 1975 and 1977, as well as a junior race bronze at the 1977 IAAF World Cross Country Championships. At national level he won a middle-distance double at the Finnish Athletics Championships in 1977, won a second 1500 m title in 1979 and took three short course cross country titles between 1977 and 1980. He was also a four-time national indoor champion.

Born in Sulkava, he later became editor of Juoksija, a Finnish sports and fitness magazine. He married Alia Virkberg, also a former distance runner.

International competitions

National titles
Finnish Athletics Championships
800 metres: 1977
1500 metres: 1977, 1979
Cross country short course: 1977, 1979, 1980
Finnish Indoor Athletics Championships
1500 m: 1981
3000 m: 1978, 1983
5000 m: 1987

Personal bests
800 metres – 1:47.74 (1977)
1500 metres – 3:38.07 (1977)
Mile run – 3:55.65 (1977)
3000 metres – 7:43.2 (1977)
5000 metres – 13:31.56 (1987)
10,000 metres – 28:25.16 (1987)

References

External links

Living people
1958 births
People from Sulkava
Finnish journalists
Finnish male long-distance runners
Finnish male middle-distance runners
Finnish male cross country runners